Komo-Mondah  is a department in the Estuaire Province in western Gabon. The capital is located in Ntoum  with a population of 90,096 as of 2013.

Towns and villages
 Ntoum

Famous people
Well-known people from the Department include Paul Biyoghé Mba.

Ecology
The Department contains the protected Mondah Forest.

References

Estuaire Province
Departments of Gabon